is a Japanese voice actress who was born in Sapporo. She is married to Inuyasha music composer Kaoru Wada. She is one of the voice actresses for Miyuki Nanase in Kindaichi Case Files series.

Notable voice roles
Sōta Higurashi in Inuyasha
Anne in Little Snow Fairy Sugar
Moe Yanagida in Tokyo Mew Mew
Inori Yamabuki/Cure Pine in Fresh Pretty Cure
Miyuki Nanase in Kindaichi Case Files
Miss Goldenweek in One Piece
Demi in Flame of Recca
Kanna Togakushi in Happy Lesson
Sayla and Nana in Superior Defender Gundam Force
Chiaki Yabe in Futari wa Pretty Cure
Kayo Ando in Futari wa Pretty Cure Splash Star
Shiori Kubou in Maria-sama ga Miteru
Sivil in Macross 7
Bomper in Engine Sentai Go-onger
Akiko Homura in Voicelugger
Kero Midorikawa in Mega Man NT Warrior
Cammy in Fortune Dogs

External links
Akiko Nakagawa at Ryu's Seiyuu Info
 

1973 births
Living people
Voice actresses from Sapporo
Japanese voice actresses